Q49 may refer to:
 Q49 (New York City bus)
 Al-Hujurat, the 49th surah of the Quran
 Firebaugh Airport, in Fresno County, California, United States